William Cruickshanks (born 24 October 1943) is a Scottish-born Australian professional wrestler and author better known by his stage name Bill Dundee. Cruickshanks is the father of Jamie Dundee and the father-in-law of wrestler Bobby Eaton.

Career
Dundee was born in Angus, Scotland, and raised in Melbourne. At 16, he joined the circus as a trapeze artist. He started wrestling in Australia in 1962 and finally arrived in the United States as "Superstar" Bill Dundee in 1974 with his tag team partner George Barnes.

Dundee made a name for himself in the Memphis Territory, where he regularly teamed and feuded with Jerry Lawler and Jimmy Valiant for years. Dundee and Lawler ventured to the American Wrestling Association in 1987 and captured the AWA World Tag Team Championship twice.

As a singles wrestler, he held the Southern Heavyweight Championship belt several times from 1975 to 1985. Also, he had a successful team with "Nature Boy" Buddy Landel that wreaked havoc in Tennessee.

Dundee had a brief run in the NWA's Jim Crockett Promotions, Central States Wrestling and Florida Championship Wrestling in 1986, where he teamed with Jimmy Garvin and feuded with Sam Houston for the NWA Central States Heavyweight Championship. He also briefly managed The Barbarian and The MOD Squad while in those territories.

He also had a run in World Championship Wrestling in the early 1990s as Sir William, the manager for Lord Steven Regal.

Dundee worked as a booker for Memphis, Louisiana and Georgia.

Dundee is still active as of 2019 in Memphis Wrestling, where he has been a heel and a baby face. He frequently appears on Jackson, Tennessee, talk radio station WNWS 101.5 with Dan Reeves and on a talk show on Public-access television cable TV channels in West Tennessee. He still promotes indy cards across Tennessee and in Southaven, Mississippi. He currently runs a podcast on Anchor named If You Don't Want the Answer, Don't Ask the Question.

On 20 July 2019, Dundee, at 75 years old, defeated Tony Deppen to win the unofficial WOMBAT Television Championship for Game Changer Wrestling in Tullahoma, Tennessee.

Books
 If You Don't Want The Answer, Don't Ask The Question: Bill Dundee's Life Story

Personal life
Dundee's son Jamie Dundee, also became a wrestler, whereas his daughter Donna, married wrestler Bobby Eaton. His grandson, Dylan Eaton, wrestles as well.

In the early 1990s he partnered with Doug Hurt, brother of Jerry Lawler's manager, in the opening of a furniture store in Evansville, Indiana called "Superstar Dundee Furniture". The store collapsed about a year after opening.

On 26 June 2021, his daughter Donna died at the age of 57 from breast cancer. Just over a month later, his son-in-law Bobby Eaton died on 4 August 2021 at the age of 62, just two weeks after suffering a fall at his home.

Championships and accomplishments
American Wrestling Federation
AWF Heavyweight Championship (1 time)
Central States Wrestling
NWA Central States Heavyweight Championship (1 time)
Memphis Wrestling Hall of Fame
Class of 2017
Mid-South Wrestling Association
Mid-South Television Championship (1 time)
NWA Mid-America / Continental Wrestling Association / Championship Wrestling Association
AWA Southern Heavyweight Championship (9 times)
AWA Southern Tag Team Championship (14 times) – with Norvell Austin (1), Robert Gibson (1), Jerry Lawler (4), Robert Fuller (1), Tommy Rich (2), Dream Machine (2), Steve Keirn (2) and Dutch Mantel (1)
AWA World Tag Team Championship (2 times) – with Jerry Lawler1
CWA International Heavyweight Championship (4 times)
CWA International Tag Team Championship (1 time) – with Rocky Johnson
CWA Southwestern Heavyweight Championship (1 time)
CWA World Heavyweight Championship (1 time)
CWA World Tag Team Championship (1 time) – with Tommy Rich
NWA Mid-America Heavyweight Championship (1 time)
NWA Mid-America Tag Team Championship (1 time) – with Ricky Gibson
NWA Southern Heavyweight Championship (Memphis version) (1 time)
NWA Southern Tag Team Championship (Mid-America version) (3 times) – with Big Bad John (2) and Tommy Rich (1)
NWA United States Junior Heavyweight Championship (2 times)
Ohio Valley Wrestling
OVW Heavyweight Championship (1 time)
Power Pro Wrestling
PPW Tag Team Championship (1 time) – with Jerry Lawler
Pro Wrestling Illustrated
Ranked No. 56 of the 100 top tag teams of the "PWI Years" with Jerry Lawler in 2003
Pro Wrestling This Week
Wrestler of the Week (21–27 June 1987)
Southeastern Championship Wrestling
NWA Southeastern Tag Team Championship (1 time) – with Tommy Rich
NWA United States Junior Heavyweight Championship (Southeastern version) (1 time)
Supreme Wrestling
Supreme Mid-America Tag Team Championship (1 time) – with Rob Royale
United States Wrestling Association
USWA Unified World Heavyweight Championship (1 time)
USWA Junior Heavyweight Championship (2 times)
USWA Southern Heavyweight Championship (3 times)
USWA Texas Heavyweight Championship (3 times)
USWA World Tag Team Championship (3 times) – with Jerry Lawler (2) and Jamie Dundee (1)
WOMBAT Wrestling
WOMBAT Television Championship (1 time, current)
World Class Wrestling Association
CWA Southwestern Heavyweight Championship (2 times)2

1Dundee's and Lawler's reigns with the AWA World Tag Team Championship began on cards hosted by the CWA through the interpromotional relationship between the AWA and CWA that also allowed the defense of the AWA Southern Heavyweight and Southern Tag Team Championships primarily within the CWA.
2The CWA Southwestern Heavyweight Championship was promoted in both the CWA and WCWA while the promotions had a working relationship in 1989 and 1990.

References

External links
Memphis Wrestling History

1943 births
20th-century professional wrestlers
21st-century professional wrestlers
Australian emigrants to the United States
Australian male professional wrestlers
AWA International Heavyweight Champions
AWA World Tag Team Champions
Living people
OVW Heavyweight Champions
People from McKenzie, Tennessee
Professional wrestling announcers
Professional wrestling executives
Professional wrestling managers and valets
Sportspeople from Angus, Scotland
Scottish emigrants to Australia
Scottish emigrants to the United States
Scottish male professional wrestlers
USWA Unified World Heavyweight Champions
USWA World Tag Team Champions